Ghabutra is a union council in the Islamabad Capital Territory of Pakistan. It is located at 33° 28' 20N 73° 19' 0E with an altitude of 575 metres (1889 feet).

References 

Union councils of Islamabad Capital Territory